Jean-Pierre Tafunga Mbayo (25 July 1942 – 31 March 2021) was a Democratic Republic of the Congo, Roman Catholic archbishop.

Tafunga Mbayo was born in the Democratic Republic of the Congo and was ordained to the priesthood in 1972. He served as bishop of the Roman Catholic Diocese of Kilwa-Kasenga, Democratic Republic of the Congo, from 1995 to 2002 and as bishop of the Roman Catholic Diocese of Uvira, Democratic Republic of the Congo, from 2002 to 2008. He then served as coadjutor archbishop and archbishop of the Roman Catholic Archdiocese of Lubumbashi, Democratic Republic of the Congo, from 2008 until his death in 2021.

Notes

External links

1942 births
2021 deaths
20th-century Roman Catholic bishops in the Democratic Republic of the Congo
21st-century Roman Catholic archbishops in Africa
21st-century Roman Catholic bishops in the Democratic Republic of the Congo
Roman Catholic bishops of Uvira
Roman Catholic archbishops of Lubumbashi
Roman Catholic bishops of Kilwa–Kasenga
21st-century Democratic Republic of the Congo people